The Tomb of the Leopards (Italian: Tomba dei Leopardi) is an Etruscan burial chamber so called for the confronted leopards painted above a banquet scene. The tomb is located within the Necropolis of Monterozzi, near Tarquinia, Lazio, Italy, and dates to around 470–450 BC. The painting is one of the best-preserved murals of Tarquinia, and is known for "its lively coloring, and its animated depictions rich with gestures," and is influenced by the Greek-Attic art of the first quarter of the fifth century BC.

The banqueters are "elegantly dressed" male-female couples attended by two nude boys carrying serving implements. The women are depicted as fair-skinned and the men as dark, in keeping with the gender conventions established in Archaic Greece, Ancient Near East and Ancient Egypt. The arrangement of the three couples prefigures the triclinium of Roman dining. Musicians are pictured on the walls to the left and right of the banquet. On the right, a komos of wreathed figures and musicians approaches the banquet; on the left, six musicians and giftbearers appear in a more stately procession.

The man on the far-right couch holds up an egg, symbol of regeneration, and other banqueters hold wreaths. The scene is usually taken to represent the deceased's funerary banquet, or a family meal that would be held on the anniversary of his death. It is presented as a celebration of life, while Etruscan banquet scenes in earlier tombs have a more somber character. The scene appears to take place outdoors, within slender trees and vegetation, perhaps under a canopy.

Although the figures are distinctly Etruscan, the artist of the central banquet draws on trends in Greek art and marks a transition from Archaic to Early Classical style in Etruscan art. The processions on the left and right are more markedly Archaic and were executed by different artists.

The tomb was discovered in 1875. In the 1920s, D.H. Lawrence described the painting in his travel essays Sketches of Etruscan Places:
The walls of this little tomb are a dance of real delight. The room seems inhabited still by Etruscans of the sixth century before Christ, a vivid, life-accepting people, who must have lived with real fullness. On come the dancers and the music-players, moving in a broad frieze towards the front wall of the tomb, the wall facing us as we enter from the dark stairs, and where the banquet is going on in all its glory. … So that all is color, and we do not seem to be underground at all, but in some gay chamber of the past.

Artistically, the painting is regarded as less sophisticated and graceful than that found in the Tomb of the Bigas or the Tomb of the Triclinium.

Gallery

See also

Etruscan architecture
Etruscan art
Tomb of the Bulls
Tomb of the Augurs
Tomb of the Dancers
 Tomb of the Diver
Tomb of the Triclinium

References

1875 archaeological discoveries
Leopards